Riccardo Paciocco (born March 25, 1961) is an Italian football coach and former professional player.

A midfielder, he made nearly 300 appearances in the Italian professional leagues, including four seasons in Serie A with Milan, Lecce and Pisa, during which he scored five goals from 74 appearances.

References

1961 births
Living people
Italian footballers
Association football midfielders
S.S. Teramo Calcio players
A.C. Milan players
U.S. Lecce players
Pisa S.C. players
Reggina 1914 players
Serie A players
Serie B players
Italian football managers